Engal Swamy Ayyappan is a 1990 Tamil-language Hindu devotional film directed by Dasarathan. It was released on 28 December 1990.

Plot

An Ayyappan's devotee (Dasarathan) tells five different stories of Ayyappan's miracles to the other devotees.

The first story is about Rajaswamy (Hari Raj). Rajaswamy, an Ayyappan's devotee, is married to Usha (Sindhu) and promises to make a pilgrimage if he gets a job. He finds a job as a car driver. While he's poor and an ardent devotee, his chief (Malaysia Vasudevan) is boastful and disrespectful. Before the pilgrimage, Rajaswamy must arrange a pooja for Ayyappan. His wife sells her jewels to organize the pooja. His chief arranges the same day the pooja with boasting. The lord Ayyappan, as a child, comes in Rajaswamy's chief house and the chief insults the lord. Ayyappan comes to Rajaswamy's house, Rajaswamy welcomes with joy and Ayyappan helps him in his pooja. Ayyappan forgives the chief.

The second story is about Swamy (Anand Babu). During his pilgrimage to Sabarimala, someone stole his things. Swamy begins to worship Lord Ayyappan and an elephant retrieves Swamy's things.

The third story is about Bhaskarswamy (Dilip) who is married to Lakshmi (Anju). He puts the Ayyapan's chain and he has to follow a strict vegetarian diet. His arrogant neighbour Sarasu doesn't care about it; she cooks fishes and she behaves very arrogantly to everyone. Later, Lord Ayyappan teaches her a lesson and Bhaskarswamy forgives her for her sin.

The fourth story is about Prasanthswamy who is married to Gowri (Kokila) and has a daughter Saumya. He was the witness of a murder. Some rowdies want to take revenge on him by kidnapping his daughter. In his dream, Lord Ayyappan encourages him to take with him his daughter for the pilgrimage. During the pilgrimage, Saumya gets lost and Salim Bhai (Nagesh), an old Muslim man, returns her to his house. The rowdies hurt Saumya and Salim Bhai's grandson. At the hospital, the doctors needed blood to save the two children, so a Christian man gives his blood and the kids are saved.

The fifth story is about Vasuswamy (Parthiban). When he returns home after the pilgrimage, his father Sivalingam (Raviraj) kicks him and his mother off his house because Sivalingam has now a concubine. Vasuswamy then finds a job in a butcher shop to make a living. The innocent Vasu is later arrested for killing his father and is sentenced to the capital punishment. Before the execution, the real culprit is caught and Vasu is released.

Cast

Dasarathan
Parthiban as Vasuswamy
Anand Babu as Swamy
Dilip as Bhaskarswamy
Hari Raj as Rajaswamy
Malaysia Vasudevan
Rajinikanth (archive footage)
Nagesh as Salim Bhai
Sindhu as Usha
Suryakanth
Anju as Lakshmi
Madhuri as Veni
Kokila as Gowri
Sivaraman
Raviraj as Vasuswamy's father
Kullamani
Karthik in a guest appearance
Chiranjeevi (archive footage)

Soundtrack

The film score and the soundtrack were composed by Dasarathan. The soundtrack, released in 1990, features 5 tracks with lyrics written by Dasarathan.

References

1990 films
1990s Tamil-language films
Hindu devotional films